Yey may refer to:

 Yey!, a television channel of the Philippines
 YEY, IATA code for the Amos/Magny Airport  of Canada
 Yei language, or Yey, a Papuan language of Papua New Guinea

See also
 Yei (disambiguation)